is a retired judoka who competed in the -60 kg division.

Biography
Koshino began learning judo with a local sports team while he was in elementary school, and became the Hokkaidō Prefecture champion for his weight class in junior-high school. He placed third in the inter-highschool tournament during his senior year, and entered Tōkai University in 1985. He won the Shoriki Cup twice while attending the university, and joined the Toyo Suisan corporation after graduating. He won the Kodokan Cup for 4 consecutive years from 1989–1992 and  All-Japan Weight Class Judo Championships for 3 consecutive years from 1989–1991, and placed second in the World Judo Championships in 1989 before winning the world championships in 1991. He retired from competitive judo after finishing with a bronze medal at the 1992 Summer Olympics. He became an instructor for the International Budo University in April, 1993.

See also
 List of judoka
 List of Olympic medalists in judo

References

External links
 

1966 births
Living people
Tokai University alumni
Japanese male judoka
Judoka at the 1992 Summer Olympics
Olympic judoka of Japan
Olympic bronze medalists for Japan
Sportspeople from Hokkaido
Olympic medalists in judo
Asian Games medalists in judo
Judoka at the 1990 Asian Games
Medalists at the 1992 Summer Olympics
Asian Games gold medalists for Japan
Medalists at the 1990 Asian Games
20th-century Japanese people